is a former Japanese football player.

Career
Tengo Miura joined J2 League club Roasso Kumamoto in 2010. He moved to S.League club Albirex Niigata Singapore in 2012 season. In 2013, he retired from football.

References

1991 births
Living people
Association football people from Okayama Prefecture
Japanese footballers
J2 League players
Roasso Kumamoto players
Association football goalkeepers